Gloria F. Y. Ojulari Sule (born 1950) is a British artist and educator based in Bristol. Her work explores cultural identity, in particular the identities of mixed race people in the United Kingdom.

Life
Gloria Ojulari Sule was born in London, England, to a British mother and a Nigerian father, and spent much of her early life in a children's home. In 1996, as a mature student, she gained a BA (Hons) in Fine Art Painting from Norwich School of Art and Design. She also has a City and Guilds Certificate of Further Adult Education Teaching.

To promote art in her local community, Sule has participated in community arts, adult education and early years education. As part of the renewal scheme of St Paul's, Bristol, she painted a well-known mural, covering seven metres on the side of a building in St Paul's. She has also painted shop signs for the Renewal Scheme, murals in Brighton Street and fascia in St Agnes, Bristol. In 2002 she worked as artist researcher advising the planning and development of St Paul's Learning and Family Centre, a community centre in St Pauls, Bristol.

A textile artwork What's our Story (2010) was commissioned by Brent Museum in response to the British Museum's touring exhibition Fabric of a Nation. An interactive costume designed for two children to wear at the same time, it was inspired by Egungun masquerade costumes worn at Yoruba festivals, Ghanaian kente and adinkra cloth, and contemporary African artwork.

References

External links
 Artist's website

1950 births
Living people
Alumni of Norwich University of the Arts
Artists from Bristol
Black British artists